Pechorsk may refer to:
Troitsko-Pechorsk, an urban-type settlement in the Komi Republic, Russia
Pechorsk, common misspelling of Pechersk